Dixie Chicken is the third studio album by the American rock band Little Feat, released in 1973. The artwork for the front cover was by illustrator Neon Park and is a reference to a line from the album's third song, "Roll Um Easy".

The album is considered their landmark album with the title track as their signature song that helped further define the Little Feat sound. The band added two members (guitarist Paul Barrere and percussionist Sam Clayton) to make the more complete and familiar line-up that continued until their 1979 breakup following the death of Lowell George. Bassist Kenny Gradney was brought in to replace original bassist Roy Estrada, who had left after the band's second album, Sailin' Shoes, to join Captain Beefheart's Magic Band. This new line-up radically altered the band's sound, leaning toward New Orleans R&B/funk.

It was voted number 563 in Colin Larkin's All Time Top 1000 Albums 3rd Edition (2000).

The title track was released as a single by Warner Bros. in January 1973 in the U.S., backed with "Lafayette Railroad" (WB 7689) and in February 1975 in the UK, backed with "Oh Atlanta" (K 16524).

Track listing
Lowell George sings lead on all tracks, except where noted:

Side One
"Dixie Chicken" (Lowell George, Fred Martin (Martin Fyodor Kibbee)) – 3:55 
"Two Trains" (George) – 3:06
"Roll Um Easy" (George) – 2:30 
"On Your Way Down" (Allen Toussaint) – 5:31 
"Kiss It Off" (George) – 2:56

Side Two
"Fool Yourself" (Fred Tackett) – 3:10
"Walkin' All Night" (Paul Barrère, Bill Payne) – 3:35 (lead vocals: Barrere, Payne)
"Fat Man in the Bathtub" (George) – 4:29
"Juliette" (George) – 3:20 
"Lafayette Railroad" (George, Payne) – 3:40 (instrumental)

Personnel

Little Feat

Paul Barrere – guitar, vocals (first album with group)
Sam Clayton – congas (first album with group)
Lowell George – vocals, guitar, cowbell, flute
Kenny Gradney – bass (first album with group)
Richie Hayward – drums, vocals
Bill Payne – keyboards, synthesizer, vocals

Additional personnel

Bonnie Bramlett – backing vocals
Malcolm Cecil – synthesizer
Tret Fure – backing vocals
Danny Hutton – backing vocals
Milt Holland – tabla
Gloria Jones – backing vocals
Debbie Lindsey – backing vocals
Bonnie Raitt – backing vocals
Stephanie Spruill – backing vocals 
Fred Tackett – guitar (joined band 1988)
Neon Park – cover art

Notes

External links 
 Dixie Chicken – album review at Rolling Stone
  – provided by Warner Music Group
  – provided by Warner Music Group

1973 albums
Little Feat albums
Warner Records albums
Albums produced by Lowell George
Albums with cover art by Neon Park
Albums recorded at Sunset Sound Recorders